Yizhou is the central district of the Hami prefecture-level city, in Xinjiang Uyghur Autonomous Region, China. Its population was 472,175 at the end of 2010. It was known as Hami county-level city until February 2016, when it was merged with the Hami Prefecture to form the Hami prefecture-level city and the county-level city was renamed Yizhou District. Xingxingxia (Singsingsia) town is located on the border with Gansu.

On February 4, 2021, the city of Xinxing (Yengi Yultuz), along with several farms and ranches belonging to XPCC were separated from Yizhou District, and formed an independent county-level city.

Demographics
The statistic below also includes the now independent Xinxing (Yengi Yultuz) City.

References

Populated places in Xinjiang
Hami